Kyu Sakamoto Memorial Hall (坂本九思い出記念館) is a museum in the town Kuriyama, Hokkaido. The Memorial Hall was built in 1993 and is completely dependent on visitor contributions. Admission is free. The hall is a 220 m2 rectangular construction with a circular pavilion in the end of it. The hall contains a big collection of records, clothes, pictures, films, and of course facts about the late singer Kyu Sakamoto.

External links 

One step to 9, a fan club (Japanese)
Official home page (Japanese)

See also 
Japanese museums

Hokkaido